Tetranematichthys is a genus of driftwood catfishes found in tropical South America.

Species
There are currently three described species in this genus.
 Tetranematichthys barthemi L. A. W. Peixoto & Wosiacki, 2010
 Tetranematichthys quadrifilis (Kner, 1858)
 Tetranematichthys wallacei Vari & Ferraris, 2006

References
 

Auchenipteridae
Fish of South America
Catfish genera
Taxa named by Pieter Bleeker